Lithuanian Zoological Garden previously known as Kaunas' Zoological Garden (Kauno zoologijos sodas) is the oldest scientific zoo in Lithuania. It is located in an Ąžuolynas oak grove park in the south-western  Žaliakalnis elderate of Kaunas.

The zoo was initiated in 1935 by famous Lithuanian zoologist Tadas Ivanauskas and opened on 1 July 1938 with 40 animals. These creatures were either personally owned by T. Ivanauskas or were gifts from other zoos. Within one year, the number grew to 150. The zoo currently has 2166 animals, and is classed as a medium-size zoo according to European zoo standards. It experienced funding difficulties during the 2000s.

References

External links 
 
  
 Lithuanian zoo in TripAdvisor
 Lithuanian zoo on the App
 Kaunas Zoo Park
 Modernization of Lithuanian Zoo in Kaunas

1938 establishments in Lithuania
Zoos in Lithuania
Buildings and structures in Kaunas
Tourist attractions in Kaunas
Zoos established in 1938